William Clark Jr. is the name of:

 William Clark Jr. (1798–1871), American politician and signatory of the Texas Declaration of Independence
 William Andrews Clark Jr. (1877–1934), American violinist, and founder of the Los Angeles Philharmonic; son of William Andrews Clark Sr.
 William P. Clark Jr. (1931–2013), U.S. Secretary of the Interior from 1983 to 1985
 William Clark Jr. (diplomat) (1930–2008), United States Ambassador to India, 1992–1993
 William G. Clark Jr. (1912–1990), American jurist and politician in Massachusetts

See also
 William Clark (disambiguation)